The women's 3000 metres event at the 1981 Summer Universiade was held at the Stadionul Naţional in Bucharest on 26 July 1981. It was the first time that this distance was contested at the Universiade after not being featured for two editions.

Results

References

Athletics at the 1981 Summer Universiade
1981